Attock Oil Company, informally called Attock Group, also known as Pharaon Group, is a UK-domiciled conglomerate company based in  Manchester, England, United Kingdom. It is the sole vertically integrated oil conglomerate company active in Pakistani market.

The group is owned by Pharaon Family.

History
Attock Oil Company Limited (AOC) was incorporated in England on 1 December 1913, and extended into Pakistan as a branch office of a foreign company for principal business of exploration, drilling and production of petroleum products.

AOC met its first oil discovery in 1915 at Khaur, Attock District. Thereafter,  AOC made significant contributions in promoting oil and gas exploration in the country by opening up the Potohar  Basin as a new oil province. The Potohar Basin remained the only oil producing basin in Pakistan till the early 1970s.

Although the company was established by British entrepreneurs and investors control was purchased by Saudi entrepreneur investor Gaith Pharaon in the 1970s. Pharaon's offspring still the company and the spinoffs and purchased subsidiaries.

In 2004, the company invested  in Pakistan. It included: petroleum pipeline from Machike, Lahore to Taru Jabba, Peshawar, and a 150 MW power plant in Rawalpindi District.

Subsidiaries
The Attock Oil Company consists of the following companies:

Listed
 Pakistan Oilfields Limited
 Attock Refinery Limited
 National Refinery Limited
 Attock Petroleum Limited
 Attock Gen. Limited
 Attock Cement

References

External links

The Attock Oil Company Limited

Companies based in Manchester
1913 establishments in England
Oil and gas companies of the United Kingdom
Energy companies established in 1913
British companies established in 1913